Halina Kwiatkowska ( Królikiewiczówna, 25 April 192112 November 2020) was a Polish actress, educator, and writer. She performed in The Cherry Orchard at the National Stary Theatre in Kraków, and starred in the films Ashes and Diamonds, The Doll, and And Along Come Tourists.

Personal life
Kwiatkowska was born in Bochnia, Poland. She attended Wadowice High School, where she met Karol Wojtyla (later Pope John Paul II). She last saw Wojtyla in 2002, after Wojtyla made a special effort to see her despite suffering from ill health. Kwiatkowska denied rumours that she and Wojtyla had been a couple in their early years, after the 2005 miniseries Karol: A Man Who Became Pope portrayed Kwiatkowska as a former lover of the Pope.

Kwiatkowska died in Konstancin-Jeziorna. She was interred in the Rakowicki Cemetery, Kraków.

Career
Kwiatkowska started acting at the Juliusz Słowacki Theatre. Her first performance was Król Duch (King Ghost) in 1941. During the Nazi occupation of Poland, Kwiatkowska and Wojtyla acted together at the underground . Kwiatkowska later worked at the Powszechny Theatre until 1947, when she joined the Kraków Theatre. In 1954, she acted in The Cherry Orchard at the National Stary Theatre in Kraków. In total, she played 64 different roles in theatre productions in Kraków. Kwiatkowska starred in nine films, including Ashes and Diamonds in 1958, The Doll in 1968, and the 2007 German film And Along Come Tourists.

For about 40 years Kwiatkowska taught at the State Higher School of Theatre in Kraków. There, she and Ewa Otwinowska wrote two plays: Ogłoszenie matrymonialne (Marriage Announcement) and Sytuację bez wyjścia (A Situation Without a Way Out). She wrote the book Porachunki z Pamięcia (Reckoning with Memory), which won a Kraków book of the month award.

Awards and decorations
Her major awards include:
1955: Medal of the 10th Anniversary of People's Poland
1977: Meritorious Activist of Culture decoration
1981: Knight's Cross of the Order of Polonia Restituta
2007: Gold Medal for Merit to Culture – Gloria Artis, 
2008: Honorary award from the Polish Culture Foundation in 2008.
2018: Medal on  the 100th Anniversary of ZASP-SPATiF ( Association of Polish Stage Artists )

References

External links
Filmography at filmpolski.pl
Halina Kwiatkowska at Encyklopedia Teatru Polskiego

20th-century Polish actresses
Polish stage actresses
Polish film actresses
People from Bochnia
1921 births
2020 deaths
Recipients of the Order of Polonia Restituta (1944–1989)
Recipients of the Gold Medal for Merit to Culture – Gloria Artis
Pope John Paul II
21st-century Polish actresses